IF Limhamn Bunkeflo may refer to

IF Limhamn Bunkeflo (men's)
IF Limhamn Bunkeflo (women's)